Angus Hines is a television producer for ABC news.

Awards
2007 George Polk Award
2007 Citation Overseas Press Club

References

American television producers
George Polk Award recipients
Living people
Year of birth missing (living people)